Howard Rice is an American small boat sailor, sailing canoeist and small craft skills instructor. In 1989-1990 (December though March) he sailed and paddled a 15' 2" sailing canoe solo around Cape Horn, Chile. Articles about his expedition have appeared in Outside Magazine, Sports Illustrated and Yachting Magazine.

He utilized a Klepper folding canoe often referred to as a sailing canoe in 1989-1990. His route took him down the Beagle Channel through the Wollaston Islands to Cape Horn Hornos Island and back as far west as Timbales in the western Beagle Channel. While at Cape Horn he double rounded east to west and then west to east. 

He prepared for the effort by extensive training for two years including sessions with ocean kayaker Eric Stiller including a number of canoe sailing training session in winter conditions. His training included paddling and sailing the Hudson River in New York at times with temperatures below zero. Other training venues included the Great Lakes and the Maine Island Trail. After his voyage Rice and Stiller worked on behalf of Klepper America and conducted small craft training sessions at Naval Air Station Key West, Key West, Florida US Army Special Forces and Navy SEAL MAROPS and Fort Campbell, Kentucky. In this role Rice delivered small boat specific training as an instructor/trainer in small boat handling techniques and marine operations. He authored the operations section in the US Army Special Forces MAROPS manual pertaining to one and two-man folding boat use.

Rice was awarded a certificate of merit commemorating his voyage around Cape Horn by the Armada de Chile (Chilean Navy) at Puerto Williams Chile on March 11, 1990, as the first solo sailing canoe to successfully round and double Cape Horn.

Return to Tierra del Fuego
From January 2017 through April 2017 he solo sailed an 11' 11" modified SCAMP sailboat down the Strait of Magellan from Patagonia into Tierra del Fuego, the western Beagle Channel and the Southern Ocean. He built the boat specifically for this voyage.

References

Living people
American male canoeists
American sailors
Year of birth missing (living people)